Cracks in the Shell is a 2011 German drama film directed by Christian Schwochow.

Cast 
 Stine Fischer Christensen as Josephine 'Fine' Lorenz
 Ulrich Noethen as Kaspar Friedmann
 Dagmar Manzel as Susanne Lorenz
 Christina Drechsler as Jule Lorenz
 Ronald Zehrfeld as Joachim
 Anna Maria Mühe as Irina
 Ulrich Matthes as Ben Kästner
  as Christoph Werner
 Gudrun Landgrebe as Vera
 Corinna Harfouch as Nina
  as Nadja
  as Olaf

References

External links 

2011 drama films
2011 films
German drama films
Films directed by Christian Schwochow
Films about actors
Films about theatre
2010s German films